Ista may refer to:
 Ernest Ista (1877–unknown), Belgian sports shooter, competitor at the 1908 Summer Olympics
 Kevyn Ista (born 1984), Belgian road bicycle racer
  Instituto Santo Tomás de Aquino (fundação 1987), Faculdade de Teologia e Filosofia, Belo Horizonte, Minas Gerais, Brasil.
 -ista (suffix), a suffix used in Romance languages and occasionally in English
 Ista (Bangladesh), a place in the Jessore District, Khulna Division of Bangladesh
 the heroine of Paladin of Souls, a novel by Lois McMaster Bujold

ISTA or Ista may also refer to:
 Illinois Science Teachers Association 
 Institute of Science and Technology Austria, a research institution in Austria
 International Safe Transit Association, a global organization that writes test procedures for performance package testing
 International School of Temple Arts, an organization devoted to promoting sexual healing and healthy attitudes towards sex.
 International School of Theatre Anthropology (since 1979), based in the Odin Teatret, Denmark
 Internet Sacred Text Archive (since 1999), archive of cultural public domain texts
 Indiana State Teachers Association, in Indiana
 International Schools Theatre Association, based in the UK, networked in schools such as The British School, New Delhi or Koç School
 International Society for Technology Assessment, related to Bryan Jennett, Fred Polak
 Ista Pharmaceuticals or ISTA Pharmaceuticals, related to Calvin A. Grant, Hyaluronidase
 International School of Traditional Aikido an Aikido organisation founded in France.
 International Seed Testing Association, an international non-profit seed testing organization